Sampurnanand Sanskrit Vishwavidyalaya (formerly Varanaseya Sanskrit Vishwavidyalaya and Government Sanskrit College, Varanasi) is an Indian university and institution of higher learning located in Varanasi, Uttar Pradesh, specializing in the study of Sanskrit and related fields.

History 
In 1791, during the Benares State, a resident of the East India Company, Jonathan Duncan, proposed the establishment of a Sanskrit college for the development and preservation of Sanskrit Vangmaya (eloquence) to demonstrate British support for Indian education. The initiative was sanctioned by governor general lord Cornwallis. The first teacher of the institution was Pandit Kashinath and the governor general sanctioned a budget of 20,000 per annum. The first principal of Government Sanskrit College was John Muir, followed by James R. Ballantyne, Ralph T. H. Griffith, George Thibaut, Arthur Venis, Sir Ganganath Jha and Gopinath Kaviraj.

In 1857, the college began postgraduate teaching. An examination system was adopted in 1880. In 1894, the famous Saraswati Bhavan Granthalaya building was built, where thousands of manuscripts remain preserved today. These manuscripts have been edited by the principal of the college and published in book form. More than 400 books have been published in a series known as Sarasvati Bhavana Granthamala.

In 1958, the efforts of Sampurnanand changed the status of the institution from that of a college to a Sanskrit university. In 1974, the name of the institution was formally changed to Sampurnanand Sanskrit University.

Departments

Veda-Vedanga
 Department of Veda                                            
 Department of Dharma Shastra                         
 Department of Jyotisha (Astrology)                   
 Department of Vyakarana

Sahitya Sanskriti
 Department of Puranetihasa                                
 Department of Sahitya                                         
 Department of Prachina Rajashastra-Arthashastra

Philosophy
 Department of Nyaya-Vaishesika                      
 Department of Vedanta                                      
 Department of Mimamsa                                    
 Department of Comparative Religion and Philosophy   
 Department of Sankhya-Yoga-Tantragama

Shraman Vidya
 Department of Baudha Darshana                       
 Department of Jaina Darshana                        
 Department of Prakrita and Jainagama             
 Department of Pali and Theravada
 Department of Sanskrita Vidya

Adhunik Jnan Vijnan
 Department of Modern Languages and Linguistics  
 Department of Social Sciences    
 Department of Education                                    
 Department of Science (Science, Home Science) 
 Department of Library Science

Research Institute
When the status of this institution was Sanskrit college, all research activities were carried out by the principal. This includes the work done for manuscripts which were kept in the Saraswati Bhavan Granthalaya

When the institution became a university, the whole research work was supervised by the director of the Research Institute. The director is the chief editor of the famous book series Sarasvati Bhavana Granthamala and is also the chief editor of the journal Sārasvatī Suṣamā. The director has to supervise all the research activities in the university. The director is the academic head of the university. Famous grammarian Vagish Shastri made valuable contribution towards the Sanskrit journal Sārasvatī Suṣamā and edited numerous books of the Sarasvati Bhavana Granthamala series.

Affiliation
More than 1,200 Sanskrit-medium schools and colleges are affiliated with this university. This is the only university in India which enjoys such widespread affiliation throughout the country. The statistics of affiliated colleges are as follows:

See also
List of educational institutions in Varanasi
List of Sanskrit universities in India

References

External links 

Sanskrit universities in India
Universities and colleges in Varanasi
Universities in Uttar Pradesh
Educational institutions established in 1791
1791 establishments in India